Then Now and Inbetween is a promotional compilation album by the English rock band the Kinks. Reprise Records issued the album in July1969 to journalists, radio program directors and disc jockeys in conjunction with the "God Save the Kinks" promotional campaign, which sought to reestablish the Kinks' commercial status in the US after their four-year ban on performing in the country.

Background and release 
In July1965, the Kinks were informally blacklisted from performing in the United States by the American Federation of Musicians. The circumstances that led to the ban are unclear but likely stemmed from several incidents during the band's first US tour; bandleader Ray Davies later attributed it to a combination of "bad luck, bad management, [and] bad behaviour".

The Kinks' ban persisted until Davies negotiated its resolution in mid-April1969. In preparation for a return tour of America, the band's first there in over four years, Reprise Records and Warner Bros. Records initiated a promotional campaign to reestablish the band's commercial standing. On , Davies and band manager Robert Wace attended a meeting with Reprise executives at Warner's headquarters in Burbank, California. Musician John Mendelsohn attended the meeting in an advisory role, having been hired after Reprise read his favourable review of the band's 1969 album The Kinks Are the Village Green Preservation Society. The group formally launched the campaign under the moniker "God Save the Kinks". Mendelsohn came up with the title, which referenced the refrain "God save the village green!" from the close of the song "The Village Green Preservation Society".

As part of the campaign, Reprise mailed press kits to journalists, radio program directors and disc jockeys. The kits included Then Now and Inbetween and other assorted items, such as guide to the Kinks' recordings and a plastic bag with blades of grass from "Daviesland village green". The compilation album was also available to public via mail order for US$2. The album has since become a valued collector's item.

Music 

The songs on Then Now and Inbetween range chronologically from July1964 to October1968 and are a mix of Shel Talmy- and Davies-produced recordings. All of the songs were recorded in the basement studios at Pye Records's London offices, except for "You Really Got Me", which was done at IBC Studios in London.

Then Now and Inbetween marked the first inclusion of "Days" on a US LP. It also featured "Berkeley Mews" a year before its first official release, as the UK B-side to the 1970 single  "Lola". The Kinks recorded "Berkeley Mews" in early1968 during the sessions for Village Green, but band biographer Andy Miller hypothesises that the band may have overdubbed additional parts for the song in anticipation of its inclusion on Then Now and Inbetween. In particular, he focuses on elements which were generally absent from the band's 1968 work, such as the heavier guitar production and the presence of a saxophone. He suggests the saxophone may have been overdubbed around May or June1969 during the sessions for Arthur (1969), since Dave Davies's song "Mr. Reporter" received a brass overdub around the same time.

Track listing 

All songs written by Ray Davies, except where noted.

Side one
"Early Chunky Medley"3:21
"Louie Louie" (Richard Berry)
"You Really Got Me"
"I Need You"
"Till the End of the Day"
"A Well Respected Man"2:38
"Dedicated Follower of Fashion"2:59
"Dandy"2:08
"Sunny Afternoon"3:33

Side two
"David Watts"1:52
"End of the Season"2:05
"Sitting by the Riverside"1:31
"Death of a Clown" (Dave Davies, R. Davies)2:25
"The Village Green Preservation Society"2:45
"Last of the Steam-Powered Trains"1:22
"Big Sky"2:12
"Berkeley Mews"2:34
"Days"2:50
"Waterloo Sunset"3:15

Personnel 

According to band researcher Doug Hinman:

The Kinks
Ray Davieslead vocals, rhythm guitar; piano ; Mellotron ; producer 
Dave Daviesbacking vocals, lead guitar; lead vocals 
Pete Quaifebacking vocals, bass guitar
Mick Avorydrums; tambourine 

Additional musicians
Clem Cattinidrums 
Rasa Daviesbacking vocals
Bobby Grahamdrums 
Arthur Greensladepiano 
Nicky Hopkinspiano; melodica ; Mellotron 
Unknown session musicians rhythm guitar , saxophone 

Additional production and personnel
Hy Fujitaalbum design
John Mendelsohnliner notes
Shel Talmyproducer

Notes

References

Citations

Sources

External links 
 

1969 compilation albums
The Kinks compilation albums
Reprise Records compilation albums
Albums produced by Ray Davies
Albums produced by Shel Talmy
Promotional albums